The Women's 3000 metres competition at the 2019 World Single Distances Speed Skating Championships was held on 7 February 2019.

Results
The race was started at 16:45.

References

Women's 3000 metres